Brian Neal (born 14 May 1948) is a former  Australian rules footballer who played with North Melbourne in the Victorian Football League (VFL).

References

External links
 
 

1948 births
Living people
Australian rules footballers from Victoria (Australia)
North Melbourne Football Club players